Leiostyla vermiculosa is a species of small, air-breathing land snail, a terrestrial pulmonate gastropod mollusk in the family Lauriidae.

Distribution
This species is endemic to Portugal.

References

Molluscs of the Azores
Leiostyla
Gastropods described in 1860
Taxonomy articles created by Polbot